Lieutenant Colonel Paul Lewis Hackett III (born October 21, 1963) is an American lawyer and veteran of the Iraq War who unsuccessfully sought election to the United States Congress from the Second District of Ohio in the August 2, 2005, special election.  Hackett, a Democrat, narrowly lost to Republican Jean Schmidt, a former member of the Ohio House of Representatives, providing the best showing in the usually solidly Republican district by any Democrat since the 1974 election. Hackett's campaign attracted national attention and substantial expenditures by both parties. It was viewed by some observers as the first round of the 2006 elections. In October 2005, Hackett said he would seek the Democratic nomination in 2006 to challenge incumbent U.S. Senator Mike DeWine; however, he dropped out of the race on February 14, 2006, and said that he would return to his law practice.

On April 9, 2009, Hackett, acting as defense counsel to Sgt. Ryan Weemer, USMC, obtained an acquittal on charges of murdering an insurgent in Fallujah on November 9, 2004, the Second Battle of Fallujah's first day.  Weemer had contacted Hackett two years earlier after he had successfully represented other Marines charged with violations of the law of war in Haditha in November 2005.  Hackett represented Weemer pro bono.  When asked why, Hackett stated that "these Marines protected me when I was in Fallujah, it's the least I could do."  The trial lasted two weeks after which the 8 member court martial deliberated for 8 hours and announced its decision acquitting Weemer of all charges and specifications, to unpremeditated murder and dereliction of duty.  Weemer's acquittal was awarded by the 8 member jury despite the government's introduction into evidence of Weemer's audio confession to the alleged violations of war.  Despite the audio confession, the 8 member jury was persuaded by Hackett's argument and through his cross examination of NCIS Special Agent Fox that Weemer had been coerced into confessing to the charged offenses by his interrogators; namely NCIS Special Agent Fox.

This is the only known instance in American Jurisprudence that a jury acquitted a defendant of murder charges after the acceptance into evidence by the trial court and publication to the jury of the defendant's alleged audio confession.

Background
Hackett, who The New York Times said is six foot two and "garrulous, profane, and quick with a barked retort or a mischievous joke", was born in Cleveland, Ohio, the son of Paul and Beth Hackett, who lived at the time in Gates Mills.  When an infant, his family moved to West Palm Beach, Florida, where his father worked for the Pratt and Whitney aircraft engine company.  Before Hackett started school, his family returned to Ohio when his father took a job with the General Electric Company's aircraft engine division in Evendale, a Cincinnati suburb.  Hackett lived in the Ohio towns of Wyoming, Montgomery and Indian Hill, and attended the Seven Hills School and Indian Hill High School.

He has a Bachelor of Arts from Case Western Reserve University and a Juris Doctor from the Cleveland State University College of Law.  Hackett also attended American University in Washington, D.C., studying under the university's Washington Semester program in Journalism. Hackett was admitted to the Ohio bar on November 7, 1988, and practices law in downtown Cincinnati with the Hackett Law Office, which he opened in 1994.  Additionally, Hackett was admitted to the Colorado bar on April 26, 2016.

Hackett saw active duty in the United States Marine Corps from 1989 to 1992, and then joined the Select Marine Corps Reserve. In 2004, he volunteered for active duty in the Iraq War, spending seven months as a civil affairs officer with the 4th Civil Affairs Group of the 1st Marine Division. He was assigned to Ramadi and supported the Fallujah campaign and reconstruction efforts there in addition to acting as a convoy commander on over 150 convoys throughout Al Anbar Province during his deployment. On October 21, 2004, a convoy under his command was hit by two roadside bombs, but Hackett was uninjured. He returned to Ohio in early 2005.

Hackett continues to serve in the United States Marine Corps Reserves and is expected to retire from the Marine Corps in April 2022 after more than 28 years of commissioned service in the Marine Corps.  He is believed to be the oldest serving Marine to score a perfect score on the rigorous Marine Corps Physical Fitness Test and Combat Fitness Test.  On June 11, 2021, at age 59 Hackett performed his final annually required Physical Fitness Test for the Marine Corps receiving a perfect score as follows:  20 pull ups, 3 mile run completed in 17:11 at 5,280' of altitude and "holding" the abdominal plank position for 4:20.  Hackett's personal awards include the Meritorious Service Medal, the Navy-Marine Corps Commendation Medal and the Combat Action Ribbon.

Hackett is married to Suzanne (Suzi) C. Hackett.  They have three children, Grace (born  1997), Seamus (born 2000), and Liam (born 2003).  The family lives in Indian Hill, an affluent Cincinnati suburb, on a small farm along the Little Miami River built in 1802.

Milford council
Hackett was elected to the city council of Milford, Ohio, a city in Clermont and Hamilton Counties, in 1995 to replace Chris Imbus, who was recalled from office by a vote of 410 to 86.  In the recall election on May 2, he defeated businessman Jacques E. Smith by a vote of 388 to 81.  On the Milford council, he opposed efforts to rezone a parcel of land in order to retain the Milford post office within the city limits.  He resigned from the council in September 1998 to devote more time to his family and his law practice and was replaced on the council by James Gradolf.  When Hackett purchased a home in Indian Hill in 2000, the purchase made The Cincinnati Enquirer'''s column of most expensive real-estate transactions in the area.

Race for Congress

thumb|300px|Detailed Map of Ohio's Second Congressional District
Hackett decided to run for Congress because "with all that this country has given me, I felt it wasn't right for me to be enjoying life in Indian Hill when Marines were fighting and dying in Iraq," he told The Cincinnati Post.  Hackett told the Dayton Daily News his friend Mike Brautigam, who met him at the airport upon his return, had told him Rob Portman, congressman since 1993, was resigning to become United States Trade Representative and Hackett should run for his seat.  Hackett decided to enter the race before reaching home.

Special general election
Hackett faced Republican nominee Jean Schmidt in the August 2, 2005, special election.  Schmidt, a former schoolteacher described by The New York Times as "small, wiry, and intense, she exudes seriousness", had been a township trustee in northwestern Clermont County's populous Miami Township for eleven years before four years in the Ohio House of Representatives.

The district was a strong Republican one.  In 2004, 64 percent of the vote in the presidential election went to George W. Bush.  Rob Portman never got less than 70 percent of the vote in his campaigns, no Democrat had received more than 38 percent since Thomas A. Luken's narrow loss to Willis D. Gradison in 1974, and no Democrat had won the district in a regular general election since John J. Gilligan in 1964.  (Luken held the seat in 1974 after winning a special election to replace William J. Keating, who resigned, but lost the November election for a full term.)  Amy Walter of the Cook Political Report said the Second District was the fifty-seventh most Republican in America.

John Green, a political science professor at the University of Akron in northeast Ohio told USA Today "It's a real steep uphill climb for him.  It is such a Republican district."  Jane S. Anderson, an adjunct professor of political science at the University of Cincinnati who has unsuccessfully run for the Cincinnati city council and the Ohio House as a Democrat, told the Associated Press
It's definitely worth it to the Democrats to put in the effort if only to keep the party energized.  Even if Paul Hackett loses, it is very important for the party for him to do well. It could be seen as a sign of opportunities for Democrats in other GOP strongholds.

Hackett was undaunted by the Republican composition of the district, claiming:
No single party owns this district.  It's not a Republican district, it's not a Democratic district. It's actually the seat of the citizens of the Second District. They deserve an opportunity to make an informed decision as to who will represent them in Washington, D.C.

Martin Gottlieb, editor of the Dayton Daily News editorial page, wrote a Republican landslide in the district was "a self-fulfilling prophecy":
It is so overwhelmingly Republican that Democrats typically don't make a real effort as a party.  A candidate puts himself up, but generally it's somebody who has no political strengths and gets no financial contributions or volunteer help to speak of.  The campaign gets little attention.  And the prophecy gets fulfilled.

Criticism of Schmidt
Hackett criticized Jean Schmidt as a "rubber stamp" for Ohio Governor Bob Taft's "failed policies" and said she would continue in that role for George W. Bush if elected.  At their debate at Chatfield College, he said "If you think America is on the right track and we need more of the same, I'm not your candidate" and asked "Are you better off today than you were five years ago?", echoing Ronald Reagan's question in his debate with Jimmy Carter in 1980.  "Rubber stamp" was Hackett's catchphrase throughout the campaign.  Hackett even appeared in front of the Hathaway Rubber Stamp store in downtown Cincinnati on July 27, to emphasize the point.

"If you think America needs another career politician steeped in a culture of corruption who does as she's told and tows [sic] the line on failed policies, then I'm not your candidate," he wrote in a guest column for The Cincinnati Post.  Hackett hammered on Schmidt's ethics. When she denied she knew or ever met Thomas Noe, at the center of the Coingate scandal at the Ohio Bureau of Workers' Compensation, Hackett produced minutes from a meeting of the Ohio Board of Regents that showed Schmidt had indeed met with Noe, once a regent.

He laid out his positions in that Post column:
I'm for limiting government.  I'm for fiscal responsibility.  I'm for a strong national defense.  I'm for fair trade.  This means I don't need Washington to tell me how to live my personal life or worship my God.  And I don't need Washington to dictate what decisions my wife can make with her doctor any more than I need Washington to tell me what guns I keep in my gun safe.  I fought for Iraq's freedom, not to come back and have a government tell me I can't have my freedom because the world is too dangerous.  Our freedoms are what make America great and desirable to the rest of the world and any government that wants to take away its people's freedoms under the pretense of national security is what makes the world more dangerous.

Hackett was highly critical of his opponent's record. On June 12, he went to Nicola's Ristorante on Sycamore Street in Cincinnati's Over-the-Rhine neighborhood to call attention to Schmidt and other members of the Ohio General Assembly having accepted dinner there and Cincinnati Bengals tickets from a lobbyist for pharmaceutical company Chiron, Richard B. Colby, on October 24, 2004 and failing to report the gifts on their financial disclosure statements. (The others were Representatives Jim Raussen of Springdale, Michelle G. Schneider of Madeira, and Diana M. Fessler of New Carlisle.) "What will she do in Washington when she's around real big money?" Hackett asked.The Cincinnati Enquirer ran a front page story on July 2, reporting on the candidates financial disclosure statements that revealed both were millionaires. Hackett was worth between $650,000 and $1,600,000, while Schmidt was worth between $1,700,000 and $6,800,000, most of her wealth in the form of a real estate company owned with her three siblings, RTJJ, LLC. These figures did not include the value of either's home.

Hackett told The Enquirer, "I'm a self-made guy.  I didn't inherit it.  I didn't marry for it.  What you see is what I made in the last decade."  The newspaper noted the median household income in the district was $46,813.  Schmidt used her own wealth in the campaign.  She told The Cincinnati Post the week before the election she put $200,000 of her money in the campaign that she had planned to use to buy a condominium in Florida.

Hackett was a strong advocate for the Second Amendment, but nevertheless lost the endorsement of the National Rifle Association to Jean Schmidt.  Hackett, a long-time NRA member and holder of a concealed carry permit, told The Enquirer "I don't know what I have to do.  I've gone against the grain in the Democratic party.  There isn't a bigger gun enthusiast than me."  (A spokesman for the NRA said the endorsement was based on Schmidt's voting record in the Ohio House and that Hackett, having only served on a city council, did not have the voting record Schmidt did.)  Schmidt also won the endorsements of the Fraternal Order of Police. The FOP's Keith Fangman criticized Hackett:  "He has a track record of filing frivolous and malicious lawsuits against law enforcement officers in Clermont County," said Fangman because Hackett had represented a plaintiff in a suit against a Clermont County police officer.  "That's what lawyers do," Hackett told The Cincinnati Enquirer. "We're not in the business of filing lawsuits we know are frivolous or malicious."

Both candidates talked of the environment.  Hackett paddled down the Ohio River to call attention to its condition.  Schmidt called for reducing America's dependence on foreign oil by increasing use of ethanol and drilling in Alaska's Arctic National Wildlife Refuge.  Hackett opposed drilling in ANWR.

The candidates participated in only two debates.  The first was held on July 7, at Chatfield College in St. Martin in Brown County, moderated by Jack Atherton of WXIX-TV, the Fox Network affiliate in Cincinnati.  Hackett told the audience his opponent was "a rubber stamp for failed policies" and "if you think America is on the right track and we need more of the same, I'm not your candidate."  The second debate was held July 26, at the Ohio Valley Career and Technical School in West Union in Adams County.  Howard Wilkinson of The Cincinnati Enquirer said Hackett in the second debate was "trying to paint Schmidt as a Taft-Bush robot."  The two also made joint appearances on WCET-TV's Forum on July 28, and WKRC-TV's Newsmakers on July 31.

Hackett held campaign rallies in Waverly in the far eastern end of the district on July 11,; in Loveland on July 19,; Mariemont on July 20,; and Lebanon, the northernmost part of the district, on July 21,.  Hackett arrived at many events on his Harley-Davidson motorcycle.

National attention on the race
Hackett attracted national attention to what had always been considered a safe Republican district. The New York Times ran a front-page story on him and articles appeared in USA Today and The Washington Post. USA Today wrote "if Democrats could design a dream candidate to capitalize on national distress about the war in Iraq, he would look a lot like the tall, telegenic Marine Reserve major who finished a seven-month tour of Iraq in March."

Schmidt made the Iraq War an issue in the race. She declared on WCET-TV's Forum that "9/11 was a wakeup call. We lost our innocence" and praised the Bush foreign policy. "The foundation of democracy that has been planted in Afghanistan and Iraq", she said, has inspired reforms in Saudi Arabia, Syria, Lebanon, and elsewhere. Schmidt always appeared in public with a button in her lapel containing a photograph of Keith Matthew Maupin, the only prisoner of war of the Iraq campaign. Hackett did not mince words about Iraq or President Bush. He told The New York Times Bush was "a chicken hawk" for pursuing the war after having avoided military service in the Vietnam War. The Times also quoted him as saying Bush was "the greatest threat to America."  Hackett in the West Union debate contrasted what President Bush had said in the 2000 presidential debates to current events. "Guess what folks?  We're nation-building!"

On July 19, Democratic campaign operative James Carville appeared at a fund-raiser for Hackett in downtown Cincinnati that raised $100,000.  On July 21, Max Cleland, formerly a United States senator from Georgia, campaigned for Hackett at a rally in Blue Ash. John Glenn, the astronaut who later represented Ohio in the United States Senate, sent out an e-mail asking Democrats to volunteer for Hackett, and Glenn campaigned with him on July 30, in Cincinnati. Retired general and presidential candidate Wesley Clark also endorsed Hackett.  Hackett also received campaign contributions from the Association of Trial Lawyers of America, the United Auto Workers, Cincinnati Bengals owner Mike Brown, and talk show host and former Cincinnati mayor Jerry Springer.

Democratic National Committee chairman Howard Dean sent out an e-mail appeal for Hackett which, combined with work by bloggers, helped raise over $475,000 in online contributions for Hackett, making him the first Democratic nominee in the Second District in years who could afford television advertisements. Hackett's ad began with a clip of President George W. Bush speaking to troops at Fort Bragg, North Carolina, on June 28, 2005, "There is no higher calling than service in our armed forces." Hackett's commercial then noted his service in the Marine Corps. The Washington Post noted the commercial "avoids any hint that the lawyer is a Democrat." Republicans were displeased. The Republican National Committee's lawyers wrote him saying the commercial deceived the public with "the false impression the President has endorsed your candidacy." Robert T. Bennett, chairman of the Ohio Republican Party, told The Cincinnati Post the commercials were "a blatant effort to dupe voters."

The National Republican Congressional Committee, the official Republican Party body that helps candidates for the United States House of Representatives, announced on July 28, it was spending $265,000 for television ads in the Cincinnati market, covering the western part of the district, and $250,000 for ads in the Huntington, West Virginia, market, covering the eastern half.  Carl Forti told The Cincinnati Enquirer "we decided to bury him" after Hackett told USA Today, in a story published that morning, "I don't like the son-of-a-bitch that lives in the White House but I'd put my life on the line for him."   Forti said the NRCC had "no concern that she will lose.  She will not lose."

The NRCC ran commercials noting Hackett had voted for tax increases while on the Milford council and quoting his statement on his website that he would be "happy" to pay higher taxes. The full quotation, in regards to raising the cap of $90,000 that Social Security payroll taxes are levied on was
I for one would be paying more in Social Security taxes, but I'd be happy to. Why? Because we've all made a commitment to pass on a better America to our children. Our parents kept their word to us, and we have the same obligation. This pledge is a cornerstone of the American way of life. Those of us who have enjoyed success have a duty to uphold this commitment to our future generations.

Democratic Congressional Campaign Committee, the NRCC's counterpart, responded with commercials noting that Schmidt had voted to raise the sales tax by 20 percent and the excise tax on gasoline by 30 percent when she was in the legislature.  A mailing to voters by the DCCC reiterated these statements under the headline "Who Voted for the Taft Sales Tax Increase—the Largest in Ohio History?" and asked "can we trust Jean Schmidt to protect middle-class families in Washington?"

The Coalition Opposed to Additional Spending and Taxes, a Cincinnati-based group founded by Tom Brinkman (who lost the GOP primary to Schmidt), began running ads in the last week of July urging voters to skip the election. COAST's president, Jim Urling, told The Cincinnati Enquirer that this might help elect Hackett, but "we think it will be easier to remove a Democrat next year than an incumbent Republican posing as a conservative."

In the general election, the Democratic Dayton Daily News endorsed Hackett. The Daily News said Schmidt's attacks on Senators R. Michael DeWine and George V. Voinovich were "remarkably classless" and "seemed to be saying that voters who like legislators who exercise occasional independence from their party should not vote for her." The Daily News said Hackett was "not your classic suburban liberal" and urged "voter[s] looking for something beyond a conventional political background" to support him. The Cincinnati Post also endorsed Hackett.  It noted Schmidt is the latest in a line of "Republican patricians" and "likely to be a dependable vote for the Bush administration" whereas Hackett is a gust of fresh air.  If we had to put a label on him, it would be Libertarian Democrat. He says what he thinks and doesn't seem to have much use for the orthodoxy or the partisanship of either party."The Cincinnati Enquirer wrote
Hackett is an attractive candidate with many qualities to admire . . . bright, personable and charismatic, with an aura of leadership. That he put a comfortable career on hold and put himself at great risk to serve his country merits our respect and thanks  . . . But some of the positions he's staked seem simplistic and not terribly well thought-out. He says the entire Patriot Act should be rejected—even those provisions that actually have enhanced Americans' civil liberties. He dismisses No Child Left Behind as "Orwellian." Hackett is also a critic of President Bush's tax cuts.

Ultimately, the newspaper did not endorse Hackett.  "The 2nd District will get a capable representative no matter which candidate prevails Tuesday. But it should get more local bang for its electoral buck if it sends Jean Schmidt to Washington," wrote the editors.

General election results
Hackett ultimately lost by a narrow margin, only 3.27 percent, the best showing of any Democrat in the district since 1974. These were the final certified numbers as reported on the Ohio Secretary of State's website.

Reaction to the results
Howard Wilkinson wrote in The Cincinnati Enquirer the morning after the election "the fact that Paul Hackett made it a very close election is nothing short of astounding... com[ing] close to pulling off a monumental political upset."  Hackett won in the eastern, rural counties of Pike, Scioto, Brown, and Adams, while Schmidt won in the populous western counties of Clermont, Hamilton, and Warren.  The Cincinnati Post editorialized Hackett's success in the eastern counties was in part from "the increasingly desperate struggle in rural areas to provide enough decent jobs for those who want them."

Following the election, many Democrats hailed the election as showing the weakness of Ohio's Republican party, which had been in control of Ohio state government for a decade, and public unhappiness with President Bush's policies.  Hamilton County Democratic chairman Timothy Burke was delighted.  "Paul was very critical of this president in a district that Bush carried easily last November, yet she barely hung on to win.  There's a clear signal in that," he told The Cincinnati Post on election night.  The Clermont County Democratic chairman, Dave Lane, told the Dayton Daily News "Here we are in the reddest of red districts and it was very, very close."

The Democratic Senatorial Campaign Committee claimed in a press release Hackett's strong showing meant trouble for Senator DeWine's re-election campaign in 2006, especially since his son R. Patrick DeWine had lost the Republican primary for the seat.  "If Ohio is a bellwether state for next year's midterm elections, things don't look too good for the Republicans", claimed the DSCC. Republicans said the election meant nothing of the sort.  "There is no correlation between what happens in a special election, where turnout is very low and you have circumstances that just aren't comparable to an election that happens on an Election Day in an election year," Brian Nick of the National Republican Senatorial Committee told The Cincinnati Post.The Columbus Dispatch referred to "the trauma of barely winning a Congressional district long dominated by Republicans" and quoted an anonymous source in the Republican party claiming "there is not a tougher environment in the country than Ohio right now. There is kind of a meltdown happening." Amy Walter of the Cook Political Report told the Dispatch "Ohio becomes the microcosm for the debate Democrats are trying to have nationally" and Democrats would argue in future campaigns "'See what happens when one party rules too long, see what happens with corruption and insider influence.'" Her boss, Charlie Cook, told The Los Angeles Times Hackett's "rubber stamp" charge had resonated with Ohio voters.

Peter W. Bronson, a conservative columnist for The Cincinnati Enquirer, wrote "Hackett's surprising finish was less a repudiation of Bush than a repudiation of Ohio Governor Bob Taft, whose name is now officially radioactive poison."  Bronson admitted Hackett "ran a strong campaign" but said he did so well only because of "the ugly primary" on the Republican side, fears that Schmidt was "another Taft RINO" (i.e., "Republican In Name Only"), and apathy by Republican voters, not dissatisfaction with Bush or Republicans in general.

John Nichols of The Capital Times (Madison, Wisconsin) saw it differently.  "The district had been so radically gerrymandered by Republican governors and legislators that it was all but unrecognizable that a Democrat could ever be competitive there" and Hackett, "a smart telegenic Iraq war veteran," had been "swift-boated" in the final days of the campaign by Republican operatives and "right-wing talk hosts" such as Rush Limbaugh.

Mark Steyn, a conservative columnist who writes for National Review magazine, wrote in the Irish Times "Paul Hackett was like a fast-forward version of the John Kerry campaign" who "artfully neglected to mention the candidate was a Democrat."  Steyn claimed any Democratic efforts to present Hackett's run as a success for the party were absurd.

Hackett told The Cincinnati Post he stood by his criticisms of George W. Bush:
Meant it, said it, stand by it.  I'd say it again.  For every vote I may have lost because of it.  I probably picked up one or two.

One voter turned off was veteran Arthur Smith of Loveland, whose letter to the editor in The Cincinnati Enquirer on August 5, said Hackett
attempted to fool the voters by masking the stench of his liberalism, using President Bush and the uniform of the military as a deodorant... I voted for the tax-raising Schmidt but had to hold my nose to do it.  I figured it was the lesser of the two evils.

Jerome Armstrong stated in TomPaine.com that the returns tapped into the growing movement within the Democratic Party willing to take the Republicans head on about the direction of this nation.

Former President Bill Clinton recognized Hackett in an October 23, 2006, speech saying "I hope Paul Hackett sees that his courage to make people see the truth about our policy in Iraq, is now sweeping the nation."

2006 campaign
Hackett on October 24, 2005, announced he would seek the Democratic nomination to challenge incumbent United States Senator Mike DeWine after rejecting a second run against Schmidt. Sherrod Brown, a congressman from northern Ohio and two-term Ohio Secretary of State, had rejected efforts by the Democratic Senatorial Campaign Committee to recruit him to the race in the summer of 2005 and had on August 17, publicly declared he would not run. Brown changed his mind and declared he would run, angering Hackett who claimed Brown had promised him he would stay out of the race, a claim Brown denies.

On February 13, 2006, Hackett announced that he was withdrawing from the race and ending his political career. Hackett told The New York Times that Senate Minority Leader Harry Reid and New York Senator Chuck Schumer recently had asked him to withdraw. He further contends that Schumer sabotaged his fundraising efforts and actively worked against his campaign.  Hackett said, "For me, this is a second betrayal...first, my government misused and mismanaged the military in Iraq, and now my own party is afraid to support candidates like me."  On March 14, 2006, he appeared on an episode of The Daily Show on a segment which satirized the mainstream Democratic Party's criticism of Hackett.

One issue Hackett faced in his campaign is the status of his Marine Corps Reserve unit, which may deploy back to Iraq during the campaign. Hackett had said he expected to return to Iraq in 2006.

Hackett later reconciled with Brown and backed his successful Senate campaign.

No rematch against Schmidt
Following the exit from the Senate race, Hackett declined to enter the race for the Democratic nomination in the 2nd Congressional District against Jean Schmidt, because he promised the Democratic candidates in that race that he would not run.  As a result a number of candidates threw their names into the race, and Hackett kept his promise. Therefore, on May 2, Victoria Wulsin (who came second to Hackett in the 2005 Democratic primary to fill the vacancy caused by Portman's resignation) won the Democratic primary to challenge Schmidt. On May 8, The Cincinnati Enquirer speculated on the possibility that Wulsin would drop out, and allow Hackett to run in her place. This scenario did not occur, so there was no rematch.

Post-campaign
After withdrawing from the Senate race, Paul Hackett joined the Advisory Board of Iraq and Afghanistan Veterans of America political action committee (PAC) to support his fellow veterans running for Congress.

Hackett has also done some talk radio by substituting for Jerry Springer on his Air America Radio show Springer on the Radio, as well as for Ed Schultz on his show.  It is not known whether Hackett wishes to continue working in talk radio.

On May 30, 2006, Hackett filed a class action lawsuit against the United States Department of Veterans Affairs over the compromise of personal information of 26.5 million veterans which may have fallen into the hands of a thief.

"After you've been in combat and you survived it, you've got this real energized sense that, 'I can accomplish anything,' and you view your country differently" he said for The Athens Messenger in February 2008, during a time he was endorsing anti-war veteran candidates such as J. Ashwin Madia of Minnesota via VoteVets.org, which created anti-war candidacy ads on the Internet, opposite Iraq Vets for Congress.

On February 17, 2010, Hackett endorsed Surya Yalamanchili in the Democratic primary for the Second District of Ohio.

See also

Election results, U.S. Representative from Ohio, 2nd District
2006 Ohio U.S. Senate election
VoteVets.org

References

Jerome Armstrong. "More Hackett Jobs" Tom Paine. August 3, 2005. (Armstrong argues that Hackett's success can be replicated) 
Elizabeth Auster.  "Attorney staying in race to replace DeWine in Senate."  The Plain Dealer.  October 15, 2005.  A6.  (Hackett on Sherrod Brown)
"A bellwether again".  (Editorial)  The Cincinnati Post.   16A.  (Hackett's success in rural areas)
"Best Democrat in 2nd race is Paul Hackett". (Editorial) Dayton Daily News.  June 3, 2005.  A12. (Endorsement)
Peter Bronson. The Cincinnati Enquirer. August 4, 2005. C11. (Bronson on why Hackett did so well)
Ronald Brownstein.  "All political eyes again turn to Ohio".  The Los Angeles Times.  August 4, 2005.  8.  (Charlie Cook's remark)
Lawrence Budd.  "Hackett hopes duty in Iraq gives him edge in contests:  Democrat seeks seat that was held by Rob Portman".  Dayton Daily News.  July 25, 2005.  B4. (Friend suggests he run)
Lawrence Budd.  "Schmidt prevails in race for 2nd District seat."  Dayton Daily News.  August 3, 2005.  A4.  (Dave Lane's comments)
 Calls for a good, clean campaign.

Lisa Cornwell.  "Democrats See Opportunity With Hackett".  The Cincinnati Post.   June 16, 2005.  A20.  (Why him and not Sanders)
James Dao.  "A Veteran of Iraq Running in Ohio Is Harsh On Bush".  The New York Times.  July 27, 2005.  A1.  (Hackett profiled)
Brian Faler.  "After Iraq, Marine Plans New Campaign".  The Washington Post.  July 21, 2005.  A6.  (Brief profile).
Martin Gottlieb.  "Hackett tests 2nd's Republicanism".  Dayton Daily News.  July 29, 2005.  A10.
Paul Hackett.  "Hackett:  No Rubber Stamp".  The Cincinnati Post.  July 23, 2005.  A13.  (States views in an opinion piece)
"Hackett offers 2nd District fresher voice".  (Editorial).  Dayton Daily News.  July 27, 2005.  A8. (Endorsement of Hackett)
 Hamilton County Democratic party endorses Hackett over other primary candidates.
 First debate at Chatfield College.

 Profile of race and the candidates.
Barry M. Horstman.  "A race of a different sort".  The Cincinnati Post.  July 30, 2005.  A1.  (Bennett's quote, Hackett approached at airport, Schmidt's condo money)
Barry M. Horstman.  "Schmidt wins in a squeaker."  The Cincinnati Post.  August 3, 2005.  1A.
"Lawyer to Vie for 2nd District Seat". The Cincinnati Post.   May 9, 2005.  A9.  (Announces run)
 Hackett's views on abortion, gun control.
 Environmental views of the candidates.
Bill Nichols.  "Democratic candidates tout Iraq war experience".  USA Today.  July 28, 2005.  
John Nichols.  "Ohio Vote Should Light Fire Under Dems."  The Capital Times.  (Madison, Wisconsin).  August 4, 2005.  12A.
"Paul L. Hackett III".  The Cincinnati Enquirer.  June 8, 2005.  C2. (Profile)
Len Penix.  "Council to vote on developer's plan."  The Cincinnati Post.  October 16, 1997.  2. (Post office rezoning)
Len Penix.  "Milford OKs zone change in effort to keep post office".  The Cincinnati Post.  November 27, 1997.  4.
Len Penix.  "Voters boot Milford council member from office".  The Cincinnati Post.  May 3, 1995.  A8. (Hackett elected)
"Priciest Homes".  The Cincinnati Enquirer.  February 6, 2000.  C4.  (Purchases home)  
Jonathan Riskind.  "Narrow Victory Underscores GOP's Rocky Road in Ohio".  The Columbus Dispatch.  August 7, 2005.  5B.  (Amy Walter and anonymous quotes, "trauma")
Malia Rulon.  "Schmidt, Hackett don't see own wealth as issue".  The Cincinnati Enquirer.   July 2, 2005.  A1. 
Bill Schneider.  "Netroots activism arrives".  CNN.com.  August 5, 2005.  (Effort on the internet and blogs to promote his campaign and raise money)
"Schmidt for Congress:  Republican offers better experience, fit for 2nd District."  (Editorial).  The Cincinnati Enquirer.  July 31, 2005.  E1.  
"2nd District Candidates".  The Cincinnati Enquirer.  May 29, 2005.  C2. (Profiles of all the candidates)
Dan Sewell.  "Iraq vet bids for Congress:  Marine underdog in Ohio special election".  Journal-Gazette (Fort Wayne, Indiana).  July 22, 2005.  10A.
Jim Siegel.  "Four Face Ethics Probe:  Lawmakers didn't report football tickets, dinner from biotech firm, inspector says".  The Columbus Dispatch.  July 8, 2005.  1B. .
Bill Sloat and Stephen Koff.  "Cleveland-born man vying to be first Iraq war vet in Congress".  The Plain Dealer.  July 18, 2005.  A1.

Mark Steyn.  "Bush is running rings around Democrats, who get flabbier by the week."  Irish Times.  August 8, 2005.  9.
"Vacant Seat".  The Cincinnati Post.  September 17, 1998.  16A.  (Hackett resigns from Milford council)
Jessica Wehrman.  "GOP winner Schmidt sticks to schedule:  Outdistances high-profile foes in crowded field."  Dayton Daily News.  June 16, 2005.  B1.  (Primary results, 57th most GOP district)
Jessica Wehrman. "GOP's Schmidt has more cash than foe Hackett:  Leads Democrat in 2nd District money race".  Dayton Daily News.  July 23, 2005.  B4.  (Finance reports filed with the FEC)
Howard Wilkinson.  "Anti-tax group, liberal PAC airing 'don't vote' message".  The Cincinnati Enquirer.  July 29, 2005.  B2. 
Howard Wilkinson.  "Boehner endorses McEwen in 2nd".  The Cincinnati Enquirer.  June 8, 2005.  C2.  (Hackett's endorsements) 
Howard Wilkinson.  "Debate shows differences".  The Cincinnati Enquirer.   July 8, 2005.  B1. 
Howard Wilkinson.  "Dems hope new guy has better chance".  The Cincinnati Enquirer.  May 26, 2005.  C3.  (Burke says Sanders can't win, Democrats to endorse Hackett) 
Howard Wilkinson.  "Ex-Sen. Cleland lauds fellow veteran Hackett".  The Cincinnati Enquirer.  July 22, 2005. 
Howard Wilkinson.  "FOP decries Hackett suit, endorses rival".  The Cincinnati Enquirer.  July 28, 2005.  
Howard Wilkinson.  "Gun-toting Hackett still can't win NRA endorsement".  The Cincinnati Enquirer.  July 13, 2005.  C2. 
Howard Wilkinson.  "Hackett stepes up with ads, prominent campaigners".  The Cincinnati Enquirer.  July 20, 2005.  C2. 
Howard Wilkinson and Malia Rulon.  "Money pouring into race:  National parties pay attention".  The Cincinnati Enquirer.  July 29, 2005.  B1. 
Howard Wilkinson.  "Sense of duty, purpose drive Hackett".  The Cincinnati Enquirer''.  July 24, 2005.  E1, E5.

External links

League of Women Voters page on the Congressional race
Hackett Law Offices
Daily Show feature on Hackett, March 2006
Hackett's blog at the Huffington Post

1963 births
Living people
American anti–Iraq War activists
United States Marine Corps personnel of the Iraq War
American University School of Communication alumni
Case Western Reserve University alumni
Cleveland–Marshall College of Law alumni
People from Montgomery, Ohio
Ohio Democrats
Ohio lawyers
People from West Palm Beach, Florida
People from Milford, Ohio
United States Marine Corps officers
United States Marine Corps reservists
People from Indian Hill, Ohio
People from Wyoming, Ohio
Activists from Ohio
Candidates in the 2005 United States elections